Mount Saltonstall is a tabular mountain, 2,975 m, standing 1 nautical mile (1.9 km) south of Mount Innes-Taylor at the south side of Poulter Glacier, in the Queen Maud Mountains, Antarctica. Discovered in December 1934 by the Byrd Antarctic Expedition geological party under Quin Blackburn, and named by Byrd for John Saltonstall, contributor to the expedition.

Mountains of the Ross Dependency
Amundsen Coast